Fields of Grace is the third studio album by contemporary Christian music band Big Daddy Weave.  This was their second release with a major label in Fervent Records. It was released on September 30, 2003.  This album charted on the following Billboard's charts on October 18, 2003: No. 177 on Billboard 200, No. 8 on Christian Albums, and No. 7 on Top Heatseekers.

Album

Track listing

Personnel 

Big Daddy Weave
 Mike Weaver – lead and backing vocals, acoustic guitars
 Jeremy Redmon – electric guitars 
 Jay Weaver – bass guitar 
 Jeff Jones – drums 
 Joe Shirk – saxophone

Additional Musicians
 Jeff Roach – keyboards
 Ken Lewis – percussion 
 Will Hunt – loop programming (2)
 Paul Nelson – cello 
 DeAna Whalen – violin 
 Jenee Keener – violin

Production 
 Jeremy Redmon – producer, recording (10), overdub engineer
 Mike Weaver – producer 
 Susan Riley – executive producer 
 Jim Scherer – executive producer 
 Jeromy Deibler – A&R 
 Holly Durtschi – A&R direction
 Jim Dineen – tracking engineer (1-9, 11), overdub engineer 
 Chris Clayton – overdub engineer
 Chuck Harris – overdub engineer
 Keith Edlin – engineer
 Jimmy Jerrigan – engineer
 David Steit – engineer
 Shane D. Wilson – mixing 
 Chris Henning – mix assistant 
 Stephen Marcussen – mastering
 Ron Roark – art direction, design, additional photography 
 Russ Harrington – photography

References

External links
Official album page

2003 albums
Big Daddy Weave albums
Fervent Records albums